Bucze may refer to the following places in Poland:
Bucze, Lower Silesian Voivodeship (south-west Poland)
Bucze, Lesser Poland Voivodeship (south Poland)
Bucze, Świebodzin County in Lubusz Voivodeship (west Poland)
Bucze, Żary County in Lubusz Voivodeship (west Poland)
Bucze, West Pomeranian Voivodeship (north-west Poland)